Freak Alley is a venue for public art in the form of murals and graffiti located in and adjacent to a service alley in downtown Boise, Idaho. The largest outdoor gallery in the Northwest, and a Boise institution since 2002, it began with a painting of a single alley doorway and now extends from the alley itself to a gravel parking lot.  Extant murals painted over and replaced by new murals (or incorporated into them) every two years; collectively it is the work of more than 200 artists. It has featured prominently in a survey of ten mid-sized American cities with thriving artistic communities in which Boise ranked second. The site, along with the back of the Union Block, received a $500,000 renovation in 2018 from the city.

Gallery

See also

References

External links

Boise, Idaho
Public art in the United States
Murals in Idaho
Graffiti in the United States
Art in Idaho